Mbula may be,

Mbula language, New Guinea
Mbula language (Nigeria)
Judith Mbula Bahemuka